The Letdown is an Australian television comedy series first screened on the ABC in 2016. It follows the adventures of Audrey, including her struggles as a new mum in an oddball mothers' group.

The title is a play on the word letdown, which refers to the let-down reflex in breastfeeding, but is also a colloquialism for disappointment, both of which are key elements of Audrey's story.

Production

First series
The series began as part of the comedy anthology series Comedy Showroom which screened on 4 May 2016. It was one of six new comedies screened in the series, which were seen as potential pilots for a full TV series.

In June 2017, the show was picked up to series by ABC, with Netflix as a co-producer. The series premiered on 25 October 2017 on ABC. The series premiered internationally on Netflix on 21 April 2018.

Second series
A second series was produced 2019 and began airing from 29 May 2019.

In the second series, Audrey's daughter is a one-year-old toddler and her partner Jeremy is living and working in Adelaide. Audrey and her friends continue to struggle with parenthood into the toddler years. At the end of the first series, Audrey discovers that she's unexpectedly pregnant.

As the second series goes on, we learn that Audrey had an abortion because she and Jeremy were not ready for a second child and because her clinician told her that a second pregnancy might rupture her uterus. Audrey tells her aloof, artsy mum about the abortion and finds out that her mum also had an abortion. During the last episode, she shares her abortion with her clinician and with her mothers' group, all of whom are supportive. Ester, a member of the mothers' group, also shares that she had an abortion when she was younger.

Cast

Main

Guest appearances

Awards
Series 1 won an AACTA Award for Best TV Comedy Program in 2018. The Pilot Episode won the AACTA Award for Best Television Screenplay in 2016.

At the ARIA Music Awards of 2020, the soundtrack was nominated for Best Original Soundtrack, Cast or Show Album.

Episodes

Series 1 (2016-2017)

Series 2 (2019)

References

External links
 
 
 (TV movie) 

Australian Broadcasting Corporation original programming
Australian comedy television series
2016 Australian television series debuts
English-language Netflix original programming